Starobelokatay (İśke Balaqatay) is a rural locality (a selo) and the administrative centre of Starobelokataysky Selsoviet, Belokataysky District, Bashkortostan, Russia. The population was 825 as of 2010. There are 12  streets.

Geography 
Starobelokatay is located 11 km north of Novobelokatay (the district's administrative centre) by road. Novobelokatay is the nearest rural locality.

References 

Rural localities in Belokataysky District
Ufa Governorate